Roger Johns (born 1 March 1954) is a former international speedway rider from England.

Speedway career 
Johns reached the final of the British Speedway Championship in 1979. He rode in the top tier of British Speedway from 1970–1991, riding for various clubs.

References 

1954 births
Living people
British speedway riders
Canterbury Crusaders riders
Coventry Bees riders
Cradley Heathens riders
Eastbourne Eagles riders
Glasgow Tigers riders
Hackney Hawks riders
Oxford Cheetahs riders
Poole Pirates riders
Reading Racers riders
Rye House Rockets riders
Swindon Robins riders
Wembley Lions riders
Wimbledon Dons riders
Wolverhampton Wolves riders